The following active airports serve the area around Val-d'Or, Quebec, Canada:

External links 

 
Val-d'Or
Val-d'Or
Val-d'Or